Bidessus is a genus of beetles in the family Dytiscidae, containing the following species:

 Bidessus alienus Zimmermann, 1919
 Bidessus anatolicus Wewalka, 1971
 Bidessus apicidens Biström & Sanfilippo, 1986
 Bidessus bertrandi Biström, 1988
 Bidessus cacozelus Omer-Cooper, 1931
 Bidessus calabricus Guignot, 1957
 Bidessus ceratus Guignot, 1941
 Bidessus complicatus Sharp, 1904
 Bidessus coxalis Sharp, 1882
 Bidessus cretensis Fery, 1992
 Bidessus decellei Biström, 1985
 Bidessus delicatulus (Schaum, 1844)
 Bidessus excavatus Biström, 1984
 Bidessus exornatus (Reiche & Saulcy, 1855)
 Bidessus fraudator Omer-Cooper, 1958
 Bidessus fulgidus Omer-Cooper, 1974
 Bidessus funebris Guignot, 1959
 Bidessus glabrescens Biström, 1983
 Bidessus goudotii (Laporte, 1835)
 Bidessus grossepunctatus Vorbringer, 1907
 Bidessus imitator Omer-Cooper, 1953
 Bidessus longistriga Régimbart, 1895
 Bidessus minutissimus (Germar, 1824)
 Bidessus muelleri Zimmermann, 1927
 Bidessus muluensis Omer-Cooper, 1931
 Bidessus mundulus Omer-Cooper, 1965
 Bidessus nasutus Sharp, 1887
 Bidessus nero Gschwendtner, 1933
 Bidessus nesioticus Guignot, 1956
 Bidessus occultus Sharp, 1882
 Bidessus omercooperae Biström, 1985
 Bidessus ovoideus Régimbart, 1895
 Bidessus perexiguus H.J.Kolbe, 1883
 Bidessus pergranulum Biström, 1985
 Bidessus perrinae Biström, 1985
 Bidessus perssoni Biström & Nilsson, 1990
 Bidessus pumilus (Aubé, 1838)
 Bidessus rossi Omer-Cooper, 1974
 Bidessus rothschildi Régimbart, 1907
 Bidessus ruandensis Omer-Cooper, 1974
 Bidessus saucius (Desbrochers des Loges, 1871)
 Bidessus seydeli Biström, 1985
 Bidessus sharpi Régimbart, 1895
 Bidessus sodalis Guignot, 1939
 Bidessus straeleni Omer-Cooper, 1974
 Bidessus toumodiensis Guignot, 1939
 Bidessus udus Biström, 1985
 Bidessus unistriatus (Goeze, 1777)
 Bidessus wilmoti Biström, 1985

References

Dytiscidae genera